"Put Your Hands Together" is a hip house song by British music producer and remixer D Mob featuring Nuff Juice. Released as the fourth single from his only album, A Little Bit of This, a Little Bit of That (1989), it made the UK top 10, peaking at number seven. The song also reached the top 40 in several other charts across Europe, as well as reaching number 71 in Australia. It heavily samples a song by the O'Jays, though not their 1973 hit of the same name, but their 1983 recording "Put Our Heads Together" from the album When Will I See You Again.

Charts

References

1989 songs
1990 singles
D Mob songs